Michael F. Bianco (born May 3, 1967) is an American baseball coach and former catcher, who is the current head baseball coach of the Ole Miss Rebels. He played college baseball at Indian River Community College before transferring to LSU where he played for coach Skip Bertman from 1988 to 1989. 

Bianco served as the head coach of the McNeese State Cowboys (1998–2000) before being named head coach at Ole Miss. He has led the Rebels to two College World Series appearances (2014 and 2022), with Ole Miss winning their first national championship in 2022.

Playing career
Bianco attended Seminole High School in Seminole, Florida where following the conclusion of a senior year, he was drafted in the 13th round of the 1985 Major League Baseball draft by the Boston Red Sox. Bianco played two seasons at Indian River Community College in Florida before transferring to LSU from 1988 to 1989. He was the Tigers' starting catcher and team captain on the 1989 team that finished third at the College World Series.

Coaching career
On June 8, 2000, Bianco was named the head baseball coach of Ole Miss. During his tenure, Ole Miss has hosted nine NCAA baseball regionals and three NCAA baseball Super Regionals. The program has won four SEC Western Division Championships under his guidance (2005, 2009, 2014, 2018), the 2006 SEC Baseball Tournament, the 2018 SEC Baseball Tournament, the 2009 Southeastern Conference Co-Championship, and eight NCAA regional championships (2005, 2006, 2007, 2009, 2014, 2019, 2021, 2022). In 2005, 2006, and 2009, his teams hosted Super Regionals. 

Ole Miss reached the College World Series for the first time under Bianco in 2014, advancing to the semifinals. Eight years later at the 2022 College World Series, Bianco and the Rebels won their first national championship with a two-game sweep of Oklahoma.

Head coaching record

See also
List of current NCAA Division I baseball coaches

References

External links 

Official Biography

1967 births
Living people
Baseball players from Wilmington, Delaware
Baseball coaches from Delaware
LSU Tigers baseball coaches
LSU Tigers baseball players
Indian River State Pioneers baseball players
McNeese Cowboys baseball coaches
Northwestern State Demons baseball coaches
Ole Miss Rebels baseball coaches
Seminole High School (Seminole County, Florida) alumni